Tropical Storm Ignacio was a weak tropical cyclone affected parts of the western United States in August 1997. The 12th tropical cyclone and 9th named storm of the 1997 Pacific hurricane season, Ignacio formed west of Mexico from a weather disturbance embedded within a more broad system. It was classified as a tropical depression on August 17, and although it quickly intensified into a tropical storm, harsher environmental conditions caused it to begin weakening as the cyclone moved northward. On August 19, Ignacio transitioned into an extratropical cyclone as it approached California, where its remnants produced unprecedented August rainfall, numerous traffic accidents, and 78,000 power outages.

Meteorological history

Tropical Storm Ignacio originated in a broad region of active weather that persisted west of Mexico during the middle of August 1997. Among multiple other disturbances, the precursor to Ignacio developed on August 16, well to the southwest of the Baja California Peninsula. Later that day, banding features formed and convection began turning counterclockwise around a nascent area of low pressure in the middle levels of the atmosphere. It continued to become better organized, and at 0000 UTC on August 17, the National Hurricane Center classified it a tropical depression.

The depression moved northwestward at  under the steering currents of  mid- to upper-level trough of low pressure off the coast of California. As such, it was upgraded to Tropical Storm Ignacio at 1200 UTC. At the same time, the storm reached its lowest recorded barometric pressure of 1005 millibars. However, due to increasingly colder waters and the presence of inhibiting southwesterly wind shear, it immediately stopped intensifying. Ignacio maintained tropical storm status for a short time, and early on August 18, it weakened back into a depression.

During its weakening stage, deep convection existed only in the northwestern quadrant of the circulation. On August 19, cold cloud tops reappeared, although this brief revival has been attributed to non-tropical baroclinic instability. At 1200 UTC, the depression was declared extratropical, and it continued northward until dissipating near California a day later. Moisture from the system persisted as it passed through the state and the Pacific Northwest, ultimately merging with a larger extratropical cyclone involving the remnants of Hurricane Guillermo.

Impact
As a tropical cyclone, Ignacio had little or no effect on land. However, its remnants produced unprecedented precipitation in parts of coastal California. In contrast, the area usually receives just trace of moisture during August. By the estimation of one meteorologist, the atypical rainfall represented a 1-in-50-year event. A Major League Baseball game at Oakland-Alameda County Coliseum on August 19 was canceled due to the inclement weather. Wine grape were adversely impacted by the heavy rainfall from Ignacio, which ruined about 10% of the year's Chardonnay and Sauvignon grapes. The unfavorable growing conditions were compounded by further rains from Hurricane Linda in September, creating what was described as a "tumultuous" year for the crops.

The storm contributed to numerous weather-related traffic accidents, at least one of them classified as major. Around 20 collisions occurred on the night of August 19 across the San Francisco Peninsula. Two crashes on Interstate 80 forced the closure of four lanes for 30 minutes, while California State Route 9 was blocked in Saratoga by a large tree which fell due to saturated soil. It is unclear how many injuries resulted from the various incidents. Thunderstorms associated with the storm system left about 78,000 electric customers in Sonoma County without power after lightning struck a power substation. The outages lasted up to a few hours. Lightning also knocked three workers unconscious in a vineyard near Lodi; they were in good condition after hospitalization.

Rainfall extended as far north as the northwestern United States, ending an unusually long, 35-day dry spell at Astoria, Oregon. It remains the most significant rainfall from a tropical cyclone in the states of Washington and Oregon.

See also
Other tropical cyclones named Ignacio
List of California hurricanes

References

Eastern Pacific tropical storms
1997 Pacific hurricane season
Hurricanes in California
1997 in California
1997 natural disasters in the United States